Lucy Dougan (born 1966) is an Australian poet who began publication in 1998.

Early life and education

Dougan was born in Perth, Western Australia in 1966.

In 2009 she completed her PhD thesis at the University of Western Australia in dual format ‘’On the Circumvesuviana’’ (poetry) and ‘’The Vesuvian Imaginary: The Woman's Journey to Naples in Three Texts’’ (dissertation). Her thesis formed the basis of her 2012 publication, On the Circumvesuviana.

Works

Poetry

As editor

Awards and recognition
 Memory Shell won the 2000 Mary Gilmore Award for a First Book of Poetry at the ASAL Awards
 White Clay won the 2006 Alec Bolton Award for an Unpublished Manuscript, ACT Poetry Prize
 The Guardians was shortlisted for the 2015 Judith Wright Calanthe Award
The Guardians was shortlisted for the 2016 Victorian Premier's Awards: Prize for Poetry
 The Guardians won the 2016 Western Australian Premier’s Book Awards — Poetry

References

1966 births
Living people
University of Western Australia alumni
Australian poets